Rhinanthus alectorolophus, the European yellow-rattle, is a plant species of the genus Rhinanthus, native to Europe.

References

alectorolophus
Flora of Europe